John Nolan (born 20 July 1990) is an Irish dancer and choreographer. He is an Irish national ballroom and showdance champion. Nolan is known for being a dancer on the Irish version of Dancing with the Stars.

Career 
Nolan has been dancing since the age of three. In his career he has an earned the title of Irish national ballroom and showdance champion. He also runs Xquisite Dance Group who competed in Ireland's Got Talent. They received Denise Van Outen's Golden Buzzer at their audition and eventually finished as runners-up in the grand final.

Dancing with the Stars 
In 2017, Nolan was announced as one of the professional dancers for the first series of Dancing with the Stars. He was partnered with RTÉ News reporter, Teresa Mannion. They were eliminated in week eight of the competition, finishing in seventh place.

In 2018, Nolan was partnered with actress and comedian, Deirdre O'Kane. On 25 March 2018, O'Kane and Nolan reached the final of the show finishing as joint-runners up alongside, Anna Geary and Kai Widdrington.

In 2019, Nolan was partnered with television and radio presenter, Mairéad Ronan. In the final on 24 March 2019, receiving more votes than both finalists Johnny Ward & Emily Barker and Cliona Hagan & Robert Rowiński, Ronan and Nolan were named as champions. Nolan became the first professional dancer to make two consecutive finals in a row.

In 2020, Nolan was partnered with RTÉ broadcaster, Mary Kennedy. Nolan and Kennedy reached the ninth week of the competition, they were eliminated in a dance-off against eventual finalists Grainne Gallanagh and Kai Widdrington.

In 2022, Nolan partnered television presenter, Gráinne Seoige. Seoige and Nolan reached the eighth week of the competition, they were eliminated in a dance-off against Jordan Conroy and Salome Chachua.

In 2023, Nolan was partnered with Derry Girls actress, Leah O'Rourke. They were the first couple to be eliminated from the competition.

Highest and Lowest Scoring Per Dance

Series 1 

 Celebrity partner
 Teresa Mannion; Average: 15.4; Place: 7th

Series 2 

 Celebrity partner
 Deirdre O'Kane; Average: 24.2; Place: 2nd

Series 3 

 Celebrity partner
 Mairéad Ronan; Average: 25.3; Place: 1st

Series 4 

 Celebrity partner
 Mary Kennedy; Average: 17.2; Place: 6th

Series 5 

 Celebrity partner
 Gráinne Seoige; Average: 17.3; Place: 8th

Series 6 

 Celebrity partner
 Leah O’Rourke; Average: 11.7; Place: 11th

References 

1990 births
Living people
Ballroom dancers